Mohammed Boutasaa (born 4 August 1999) is a Dutch-Moroccan kickboxer, currently competing in the featherweight division of ONE Championship.

As of June 2022 he was the #8 ranked Lightweight kickboxer in the world by Combat Press.

Biography and career

Enfusion
Boutasaa made his professional debut against Ahmad Chikh Musa at Enfusion Talents 41 on November 11, 2017. He won the fight by unanimous decision. Boutasaa amassed a 9–0 record during the next two years, with two stoppage victories, before challenging for the Enfusion title.

Boutasaa faced Khalid Elmoukadam for the vacant Enfusion 67 kg World Championship at Enfusion #96 on February 29, 2020. He won the fight by unanimous decision.

After capturing the vacant title, Boutasaa was booked to face Angelo Volpe in a non-title bout at Enfusion #99 on October 17, 2020. He won the fight by a third-round knockout.

Boutasaa faced Youssef El Haji in a non-title bout at Enfusion #103 on October 23, 2021, following a year-long absence from the sport. He won the fight by unanimous decision.

Boutassa faced Patryk Radoń in another non-title bout at Enfusion #104 on November 12, 2021. He won the fight by a second-round stoppage, flooring Radoń with a left hook.

ONE Championship
On March 31, 2022, ONE Championship announced that they had signed Boutasaa. Boutasaa made his promotional debut against the former Glory Lightweight Champion and Kunlun Fight 70kg World Max Tournament Champion Davit Kiria at ONE 157 on May 20, 2022. He won the fight by unanimous decision.

Boutasaa is scheduled to face the former Glory and Kunlun Fight lightweight champion Sitthichai Sitsongpeenong at ONE on Prime Video 3 on October 21, 2022. He lost the fight by unanimous decision.

Titles and accomplishments
Enfusion
 2020 Enfusion -67 kg World Championship
 2019 Knockout of the Year 

Fight record

|-  style="background:#fbb;"
| 2022-10-22 || Loss ||align=left| Sitthichai Sitsongpeenong || ONE on Prime Video 3 || Kuala Lumpur, Malaysia || Decision (Unanimous) || 3 || 3:00
|-  style="background:#cfc;"
| 2022-05-20|| Win ||align=left| Davit Kiria || ONE 157 || Kallang, Singapore || Decision (Unanimous) || 3 || 3:00

|- align="center" bgcolor="#CCFFCC"
| 2021-11-12|| Win || align="left" | Patryk Radoń  || Enfusion #104 ||Abu Dhabi, United Arab Emirates|| KO (Left hook) || 2 ||  

|- align="center" bgcolor="#CCFFCC"
| 2021-10-23|| Win || align="left" | Youssef El Haji  || Enfusion #103 ||Wuppertal, Germany|| Decision (Unanimous) || 3 || 3:00 

|- align="center" bgcolor="#CCFFCC"
| 2020-10-17|| Win || align="left" | Angelo Volpe || Enfusion #99 ||Wuppertal, Germany|| TKO (Referee stoppage) || 3 || 2:48

|- align="center" bgcolor="#CCFFCC"
| 2020-02-29|| Win || align="left" | Khalid el Moukadam || Enfusion #96 ||Eindhoven, Netherlands|| Decision (Unanimous)|| 5 || 3:00
|-
! style=background:white colspan=9 |

|- align="center" bgcolor="#CCFFCC"
| 2019-11-02|| Win || align="left" | Ilias Zouggary || Enfusion #90 ||Antwerp, Belgium|| KO (Right High Kick)|| 1 || 0:30

|- align="center" bgcolor="#CCFFCC"
| 2019-06-30|| Win || align="left" | Ahmad Chikh Mousa || Mano a Mano - Return Of The King ||Amsterdam, Netherlands|| Decision (Unanimous) || 3 || 3:00 

|- align="center" bgcolor="#CCFFCC"
| 2019-06-08|| Win || align="left" | Kristian Malocaj|| Enfusion #85 ||Groningen, Netherlands|| Decision (Unanimous) || 3 || 3:00

|- align="center" bgcolor="#CCFFCC"
| 2019-02-23|| Win || align="left" | Bahez Khoshnaw || Enfusion #79 ||Eindhoven, Netherlands|| Decision (Unanimous) || 3 || 3:00

|- align="center" bgcolor="#CCFFCC" 
| 2018-11-17|| Win || align="left" | Shamil Uvaysov || Enfusion #74 ||Groningen, Netherlands|| TKO (Low kick) || 3 || 1:21 

|- align="center" bgcolor="#CCFFCC"
| 2018-05-12|| Win || align="left" | Kevin Henneken || Enfusion #67 ||The Hague, Netherlands|| Decision (Unanimous) || 3 || 3:00 

|- align="center" bgcolor="#CCFFCC"
| 2018-04-14|| Win || align="left" | Faouzi el Kandousi || Bari Gym ||Noordwijkerhout, Netherlands|| Decision (Unanimous) || 3 || 3:00 

|- align="center" bgcolor="#CCFFCC"
| 2018-03-09 || Win || align="left" | Islem Hamech || Enfusion Talents 47 ||Abu Dhabi, United Arab Emirates|| Decision (Unanimous) || 3 || 3:00

|- align="center" bgcolor="#CCFFCC"
| 2017-11-11|| Win || align="left" | Ahmad Chikh Mousa || Enfusion Talents 41 ||Amsterdam, Netherlands|| Decision (Unanimous) || 3 || 3:00 

|-
| colspan=9 | Legend:    

|- style="background:#cfc;"
| 2016-04-09 || Win ||align=left| Hafiz Ashikali || Bari Gym Kickboks Event 13 ||  Noordwijkerhout, Netherlands || Decision || 3 || 2:00
|-
|- style="background:#cfc;"
| 2016-02-07 || Win ||align=left| Hamza Hazzar || Buurthuis Transvaal ||  Amsterdam, Netherlands || Decision || 3 || 2:00
|-
| colspan=9 | Legend''':

See also
 List of male kickboxers
 List of current ONE fighters

References

Living people
1999 births
Dutch male kickboxers
Moroccan male kickboxers
Sportspeople from Amsterdam
Lightweight kickboxers
ONE Championship kickboxers